Running crew, run crew or stage crew, is a collective term used in the theatre to describe the members of the technical crew who supervise and operate ("run") the various technical aspects of the production during a performance. While the "technical crew" includes all persons other than performers involved with the production, such as those who build and take down the sets and place the lighting, the term "running crew" is generally limited to those who work during an actual performance.

The term is typically not applied to crew or department heads, although there are exceptions. The running crew may include performers if they also function in technical capacities while offstage.

Crew positions
A typical running crew will include any or all of the following positions, depending on the nature and size of the production, and the complexity of the technical requirements. Each position is organized by the most common title; depending on the country, type of production, and producing organization, different titles may be used for the same position.

Stage management
 Assistant stage manager: Assists the stage manager in their duties. Generally, one assistant stage manager is in charge of running backstage operations during a show.
 Props: responsible for maintenance and placement of hand props before scenes as well as their subsequent retrieval after the scene.
 Call boy: responsible for alerting actors and actresses of their entrances in time for them to appear on stage, on cue.

Lighting
 Light board operator: operates the [stage lighting|lighting control system]. Sometimes this is integrated with the show control system.
 Deck Electrician: responsible for placing, connecting, and/or operating stage lighting units, such as stage lights. Sometimes, they are necessary to have during scene changes, in the case of moving set pieces with lighting equipment inside. Typically, more than one will be backstage.
 Master Electrician: responsible for the maintenance and operation of dimming & power distribution systems during a performance, including "hot" or "live" patching. Occasionally, some of these duties could also be delegated to the run crew's deck electricians.
 Spotlight Operator (or follow spot operator/dome operator): operates a type of lighting instrument called a follow spot, which allows a performer to be lit evenly no matter where on stage they may go. It can typically be found in the lighting booth, along with the light board op. Also, some theaters have followed spots located above a false ceiling, on the catwalk.

Sound
 Sound operator (A1): operates the sound board and/or audio control system specified by the sound designer, computerized or otherwise. Sometimes this is integrated with the show control system. There can be multiple soundboard ops.
 Mic wrangler (A2): manages microphones and maintains headsets as a show runs. Usually, there are several mic wranglers located backstage, in the wings, with the running crew.

Stage
 Flymen (or fly crew/rail crew): operate the fly system, a system of ropes or wires, pulleys, and counterweights by means of which scenery is "flown" in and out (down and up, respectively) during scene changes.
 Stagehand: A technician responsible for moving scenery at the stage level, by manually carrying or rolling set pieces (e.g., scenery wagons) between the stage and the wings. This can include carrying on and off furniture, props, or scenery.

Costumes
 Wardrobe: A costume designer is responsible for creating, purchasing, and the placement of costumes. They have assistants who help with fittings and quick changes (when an actor needs to change costume very quickly, often backstage).
 Makeup: responsible for applying or assisting in the application of face and body paints, wigs and hairpieces, etc.

References 

Stage crew
Stagecraft
Theatrical occupations